Hollo (also Hallo, Niesky, or Nisky) is an unincorporated community in Northampton County, Pennsylvania. It is part of the Lehigh Valley metropolitan area, which had a population of 861,899 and was the 68th most populous metropolitan area in the U.S. as of the 2020 census.

References

Unincorporated communities in Northampton County, Pennsylvania
Unincorporated communities in Pennsylvania